Kupath Rabbi Meir Baal HaNess Kolel Polen, known also by the initials Kupat RaMBaN is a charity founded in 1796 in Poland. It is named after the Rabbi Meir the tanna.

It was founded by Abraham Kalisker, a rabbi living in Tiberias.

21st century 
Leaders of the organization include rabbis Yitzchak Meir Alter, Meir Auerbach, Chaim Elozor Wax, and Jacob Meir Biderman.

Programs include:

 Medical Assistance – Individuals facing medical challenges who cannot afford to pay their bills receive financial assistance.
 Unemployment Fund – Financial assistance is given to those facing temporary unemployment.
 Ezer Nisu’in – Stipends are given for families marrying off children.
 Almanah Support – Widows receive regular stipends.
 Newborn Fund – Those with newborns are given financial assistance.

References

External links  
  

Jewish charities
Kollelim
Settlement movements in Israel
Jews and Judaism in Ottoman Palestine
Jews in Mandatory Palestine
Charities based in Poland